Creature Features is a generic title for a genre of TV horror series.

Creature Features may also refer to:

 Creature Features (1969 TV series), an American horror film show
 Creature Features (Australian TV series), an Australian children's television show aired from 2002 to 2008